Simon Walker may refer to:

People 
 Simon Walker (businessman) (born 1953), Director General of the Institute of Directors
 Simon Walker (composer) (born 1961), Australian composer
 Simon Walker (historian) (1958–2004), English medievalist
 Simon Walker (sailor) (born 1968), English yachtsman, adventurer and author

Fictional characters 
 Simon Walker (Hollyoaks), a character on the British soap opera Hollyoaks